Gilby Engineering was a British general engineering company owned by Syd Greene. Greene had lost an arm in a bicycle accident at 16 but went on to compete in many UK speed trials very successfully in the early 1950s. After he stopped competing, he fed his enthusiasm for motor racing by founding a motor racing team named after his company and later constructing the Gilby racing car. The team competed in 12 Formula One World Championship Grands Prix, including 6 with cars of their own construction, but scored no World Championship points. The Gilby cars were constructed by Syd Greene for his son Keith to drive, having previously entered a Maserati 250F for Roy Salvadori and Ivor Bueb and also a Cooper for Greene Jr. Keith Greene later became better known as a team manager in Formula One and sports car racing. Keith Greene achieved a third-place finish in the non-championship Naples Grand Prix of 1962, with the BRM-engined car, behind the works Ferrari's of Willy Mairesse and Lorenzo Bandini.

Complete Formula One World Championship results

Gilby Engineering
(key)

* Gilby did not compete as a constructor

Other Gilby cars
(key)

References

Formula One constructors
Formula One entrants
British auto racing teams
British racecar constructors
Auto racing teams established in 1954
Auto racing teams disestablished in 1962